"The Prowler" is the fourth television play episode of the first season of the Australian anthology television series Australian Playhouse. "The Prowler" was written by Pat Flower and directed by Alan Burke and originally aired on ABC on 9 May 1966.

Plot
A man, tired of hearing about his wife's dead first husband, decides to resurrect the man when rumours about a prowler begin to circulate.

Cast
 Gwen Plumb as Elsie Hopewell
 Stewart Ginn as her husband Fred
 Judith Champ as Jean Thurston
 Roger Box as Morgan Thurston
 Anthony Thurbon as detective

Reception
The Sydney Morning Herald critic called it "negligible and easily puffed up to pass half an hour at a fairly slow pace; but it was quite entertainingly watchable thanks to Miss Flower's clever way with turns of phrase true to suburban bickering" and some "beautifully relaxed and subtle comedy-acting of Stewart Ginn and Gwen Plumb."

The Sunday The Sydney Morning Herald critic, who thought Flower's "The Tape Recorder" was "brilliant" called "The Prowler" "a miss".

The Age said "the play was well acted and well produced; but it did not add up to anything. It felt as though I had been reading a novel and skipping page after page just to get to the story only to find that it had not been worth the trouble."

See also
 List of television plays broadcast on Australian Broadcasting Corporation (1960s)

References

External links
 
 
 

1966 television plays
1966 Australian television episodes
1960s Australian television plays
Australian Playhouse (season 1) episodes